Dmitri Vyacheslavovich Voskoboynikov (March 6, 1941 – December 2, 2001) was a Russian former volleyball player who competed for the Soviet Union in the 1964 Summer Olympics.

He was born in Moscow.

In 1964, he was part of the Soviet team which won the gold medal in the Olympic tournament. He played seven matches.

External links
 profile

1941 births
2001 deaths
Soviet men's volleyball players
Olympic volleyball players of the Soviet Union
Volleyball players at the 1964 Summer Olympics
Olympic gold medalists for the Soviet Union
Olympic medalists in volleyball
Russian men's volleyball players
Medalists at the 1964 Summer Olympics